Rodolfo Antonio González Aránguiz (born 28 February 1989) is a Chilean professional footballer who plays as a defender for Primera B de Chile side Cobreloa.

International career
Along with Chile U18 he won the 2008 João Havelange Tournament.

Honours
Chile U18
 João Havelange Tournament: 2008

References

External links
 
 

1989 births
Living people
Footballers from Santiago
Chilean footballers
Association football defenders
Chile youth international footballers
Cobreloa footballers
Cobresal footballers
Rangers de Talca footballers
C.D. Antofagasta footballers
Chilean Primera División players
Primera B de Chile players